Ford Carter Quillen (born September 21, 1938) is an American attorney and former Democratic Party politician. A native of Gate City in Scott County, Virginia, Quillen was first elected to the Virginia House of Delegates in 1969, where he continued to serve until his decision to retire and not seek reelection in 1993. When Speaker A. L. Philpott stepped down due to poor health in 1991, Quillen, as Chair of the House Privileges and Elections Committee, became his temporary replacement until Tom Moss's election in November.

References

External links 
 

1938 births
Living people
People from Gate City, Virginia
Democratic Party members of the Virginia House of Delegates
University of Tennessee alumni
University of Tennessee College of Law alumni
20th-century American politicians